Open Heart is a 2012 short documentary film directed by Kief Davidson about eight Rwandan children who leave their families to receive heart surgery. The film was nominated for the 2013 Academy Award for Best Documentary (Short Subject).

After being nominated for an Academy Award the film was released along with all the other 15 Oscar-nominated short films in theaters by ShortsHD.

References

External links

Open Heart at the website of Kief Davidson

2012 films
2012 short documentary films
Documentary films about health care
Documentary films about children with disability
Films scored by Johnny Klimek